The Terreneuvian is the lowermost and oldest series of the Cambrian geological system. Its base is defined by the first appearance datum of the trace fossil Treptichnus pedum around  million years ago. Its top is defined as the first appearance of trilobites in the stratigraphic record around  million years ago. This series' name was formally accepted by the International Commission on Stratigraphy in 2007.

The Fortunian stage and presently unnamed Cambrian Stage 2 are the stages within this series. The Terreneuvian corresponds to the pre-trilobitic Cambrian.

The name Terreneuvian is derived from Terre Neuve, the French name for the island of Newfoundland, Canada, where many rocks of this age are found, including the type section.

Type locality 
The type locality (GSSP) of the Terreneuvian is in Fortune Head, at the northern edge of the Burin Peninsula, Newfoundland, Canada. The outcrops show a carbonate-siliciclastic succession which is mapped as the Chapel Island Formation. The formation is divided into the following members that are composed of peritidal sandstones and shales (Member 1), muddy deltaic and shelf sandstones and mudstones (Member 2A), laminated siltstones (Member 2B and 3) and mudstones and limestones of the inner shelf (Member 4). The Precambrian-Cambrian boundary lies 2.4 m above the base of the second member, which is the lowest occurrence of Treptichnus pedum. The traces can be seen on the lower surface of the sandstone layers. The first calcareous shelled skeletal fossils (Ladatheca cylindrica) are 400 m above the boundary. The first trilobites appear 1400 m above the boundary, which corresponds to the beginning of the Branchian Series (Series 2).

References

See also 
 Stratigraphy of the Cambrian

 
01
Geological epochs
Cambrian Canada